Typhoon Chanthu, known in the Philippines as Tropical Storm Caloy, was a weak typhoon that impacted southeastern China in the 2010 Pacific typhoon season.

Meteorological history
 Early on July 17, the JMA reported that a tropical depression had developed about 220 km (135 mi) to the northeast of Manila, Philippines. Later that day the JTWC reported that the depression had a small low level circulation center with deep convection flaring to the northeast of the center. However, as the low level circulation center was located close to land and was not very organized, the JTWC declared that there was a poor chance of it becoming a significant tropical cyclone within 48 hours. However, during that day, the depression rapidly consolidated with an anticyclone helping to develop the low level circulation center. As a result, early the next day the JTWC issued a tropical cyclone formation alert on the depression, however they thought that further development might be hindered as it was located close to land. Whilst it moved along the southern edge of the subtropical ridge, the Depression made landfall in Aurora province at 0600 UTC, before the JTWC initiated advisories later that morning, as the low level circulation center had consolidated and poleward outflow into the tropical upper tropospheric trough had improved. Late on July 19, PAGASA issued their last advisory on Tropical Storm Caloy as it had moved out of their Area of Responsibility Then, Chanthu began to head to China, where it peaked as a Category 1 hurricane. It made landfall on China and soon dissipated hours later. Throughout Aurora, heavy rains triggered flash flooding which destroyed at least one home and stranded hundreds of residents. The Paltic barangay, within Dingalan, became inaccessible to rescuers after the local river topped its banks and washed out nearby slopes. Following the system's development, PAGASA stated that rainfall from system could trigger landslides and flooding in Aurora, the Bicol Region, and Quezon.

Impact

Philippines 
In Luzon, heavy rains triggered floods that destroyed at least one house and stranded thousands of people. Eight people were killed in the Philippines.

China 
In China, The Xinhua State news reported that two people were killed by walls that were blown over by strong gales. The typhoon made landfall near the city of Wuchuan. State-run television broadcast images of large waves crashing on to the Guangdong shore, trees flattened by wind and electric poles collapsed onto streets under heavy rain. Thereafter heavy flooding swept away a 50-year-old man in a village in Hong Kong. The southern Chinese provinces of Guangdong and Hainan braced themselves, ahead of Typhoon Chanthu's expected landfall. Guangdong meteorological authorities, have launched the highest level of disaster response. In all, 9 people were killed in South China, and total economic losses were counted to be CNY 5.54 billion (US$817.7 million).

Hong Kong 
When Chanthu's rain bands passed over Hong Kong, heavy rains brought about serious floodings across the territory. The Black Rainstorm Signal was issued. Two people were drowned and found dead, and two are still missing.

References

External links

JMA General Information of Typhoon Chanthu (1003) from Digital Typhoon
The JMA's Best Track Data on Typhoon Chanthu (1003) 
The JMA's RSMC Best Track Data (Graphics) on Typhoon Chanthu (1003)
The JMA's RSMC Best Track Data (Text)
The JTWC's Best Track Data on Typhoon 04W (Chanthu)
04W.CHANTHU from the U.S. Naval Research Laboratory

2010 disasters in the Philippines
Typhoons in the Philippines
2010 Pacific typhoon season
Typhoons
Typhoons in Vietnam
Typhoons in China
Typhoons in Hong Kong
Chanthu